The Okapi is a 6×6 mine-protected vehicle (MPV) which can be configured for use in various roles: command and control, fire control post or specialised anti-mine equipment carrier.

Production history

Variants
 Command and control
 Fire control
 Biological detection
 Electronic warfare

Operators
 South Africa

External links
 FAS.org

Armoured personnel carriers of South Africa
Cold War military equipment of South Africa
Command vehicles
Wheeled armoured personnel carriers
Six-wheeled vehicles